Anatoli Semyonovich Ionov (May 23, 1939 – May 12, 2019) was an ice hockey player who played in the Soviet Hockey League.  He played for Kristall Elektrostal, Krylya Sovetov Moscow and HC CSKA Moscow.  He was part of the Soviet Union team which won the gold medal at the 1968 Winter Olympics. He was inducted into the Russian and Soviet Hockey Hall of Fame in 1965.  Following his playing career, he was coach, and later president, of Kristall Elektrostal.

References

External links

Russian and Soviet Hockey Hall of Fame bio

1939 births
2019 deaths
HC CSKA Moscow players
Ice hockey players at the 1968 Winter Olympics
Krylya Sovetov Moscow players
Medalists at the 1968 Winter Olympics
Olympic gold medalists for the Soviet Union
Olympic ice hockey players of the Soviet Union
Olympic medalists in ice hockey
People from Noginsk
Soviet ice hockey right wingers
Sportspeople from Moscow Oblast